Ramapura is a village in the southern state of Karnataka, India. It is located in the Gauribidanur taluk of Chikkaballapura district in Karnataka. It is situated 15 km away from sub-district headquarter Gauribidanur and 47 km away from district headquarter Chikkaballapura.

Demographics
According to Census 2011 information the location code or village code of Ramapura village is 623205.  Ramapura village is also a gram panchayat. Villages comes under Ramapura gram Panchayat are Ramapura, Papaganahalli, Kundihalli, Kudurebalya, Jodibisilahalli and Hampasandra.

The total geographical area of village is 408.6 hectares. Ramapura has a total population of 2,345 peoples with 1,151 males and 1,194 females. There are about 560 houses in Ramapura village. Gauribidanur is nearest town to Ramapura which is approximately 15 km away.

Economy
Agriculture the main occupation of Ramapura people. There are no rivers of life around Ramapura. The agriculture is rain-dependent. There are no industries in around the region.

Facilities
Ramapura has below types of facilities.

 Government higher primary School
 Government high School
 Ramapura KMF (Karnataka Milk Federation) Dairy
 Government Grocery store
 Ramapura Gram Panchayat Office
 Government Primary health center
 Pragathi Krishna Gramin Bank
 Government Nursery School
 Post Office
 Ramapura Power Station
 Gram Panchayat Library

Temples
 Sri Varamahalakshmi Temple

See also
Hirebidanur

References

External links
 https://chikkaballapur.nic.in/en/

Villages in Chikkaballapur district